The long-billed honeyeater (Melilestes megarhynchus) is a species of bird in the family Meliphagidae. It is monotypic within the genus Melilestes.

Distribution and habitat
It is found in New Guinea and offshore islands, where its natural habitats are subtropical or tropical moist lowland forest and subtropical or tropical moist montane forest.

References

long-billed honeyeater
Birds of New Guinea
long-billed honeyeater
long-billed honeyeater
Taxonomy articles created by Polbot